These 635 species belong to the genus Apanteles, braconid wasps.

Apanteles species

 Apanteles abdera Nixon, 1965
 Apanteles abditus Muesebeck, 1957
 Apanteles acoris Nixon, 1965
 Apanteles acutissimus Granger, 1949
 Apanteles adelinamoralesae Fernández-Triana, 2014
 Apanteles adoxophyesi Minamikawa, 1954
 Apanteles adreus Nixon, 1965
 Apanteles adrianachavarriae Fernández-Triana, 2014
 Apanteles adrianaguilarae Fernández-Triana, 2014
 Apanteles adrianguadamuzi Fernández-Triana, 2014
 Apanteles afer Wilkinson, 1932
 Apanteles agatillus Nixon, 1965
 Apanteles aglaope Nixon, 1965
 Apanteles aglaus Nixon, 1965
 Apanteles agrus Nixon, 1965
 Apanteles aichagirardae Fernández-Triana, 2014
 Apanteles aidalopezae Fernández-Triana, 2014
 Apanteles alaspharus Nixon, 1965
 Apanteles alastor de Saeger, 1944
 Apanteles alazoni Lozan, 2008
 Apanteles albanjimenezi Fernández-Triana, 2014
 Apanteles albinervis (Cameron, 1904)
 Apanteles alejandromasisi Fernández-Triana, 2014
 Apanteles alejandromorai Fernández-Triana, 2014
 Apanteles alexanderi Brèthes, 1922
 Apanteles allofulvigaster Long, 2007
 Apanteles alvarougaldei Fernández-Triana, 2014
 Apanteles anabellecordobae Fernández-Triana, 2014
 Apanteles anamarencoae Fernández-Triana, 2014
 Apanteles anamartinezae Fernández-Triana, 2014
 Apanteles anariasae Fernández-Triana, 2014
 Apanteles anatole Nixon, 1965
 Apanteles andreacalvoae Fernández-Triana, 2014
 Apanteles angaleti Muesebeck, 1956
 Apanteles angelsolisi Fernández-Triana, 2014
 Apanteles angulatus Granger, 1949
 Apanteles angustibasis Gahan, 1925
 Apanteles anodaphus Nixon, 1965
 Apanteles ansata Song & Chen, 2004
 Apanteles anthozelae de Saeger, 1941
 Apanteles anticlea Nixon, 1965
 Apanteles antilla Nixon, 1965
 Apanteles arachidis Risbec, 1951
 Apanteles araeceri Wilkinson, 1928
 Apanteles aragatzi Tobias, 1976
 Apanteles arielopezi Fernández-Triana, 2014
 Apanteles arion Nixon, 1965
 Apanteles ariovistus Nixon, 1965
 Apanteles aristaeus Nixon, 1965
 Apanteles aristoteliae Viereck, 1912
 Apanteles arsanes Nixon, 1965
 Apanteles articas Nixon, 1965
 Apanteles artustigma Liu & Chen, 2015
 Apanteles arundinariae de Saeger, 1944
 Apanteles asphondyliae (Kieffer & Jörgensen, 1910)
 Apanteles assis Nixon, 1965
 Apanteles atrocephalus Granger, 1949
 Apanteles attevae Yousuf, Hassan & Singh, 2008
 Apanteles audens Kotenko, 1986
 Apanteles aurangabadensis Rao & Chalikwar, 1970
 Apanteles azollae Sumodan & Sevichan, 1989
 Apanteles bajariae Papp, 1975
 Apanteles baldufi Muesebeck, 1968
 Apanteles balteatae Lal, 1942
 Apanteles balthazari (Ashmead, 1900)
 Apanteles bannaensis Song, Chen & Yang, 2001
 Apanteles baoli Risbec, 1951
 Apanteles basicavus Liu & Chen, 2015
 Apanteles bellatulus de Saeger, 1944
 Apanteles bernardoespinozai Fernández-Triana, 2014
 Apanteles bernyapui Fernández-Triana, 2014
 Apanteles bettymarchenae Fernández-Triana, 2014
 Apanteles bienvenidachavarriae Fernández-Triana, 2014
 Apanteles biroicus Papp, 1973
 Apanteles bitalensis de Saeger, 1944
 Apanteles bordagei Giard, 1898
 Apanteles brachmiae Bhatnagar, 1950
 Apanteles braziliensis (Kieffer & Tavares, 1925)
 Apanteles bredoi de Saeger, 1941
 Apanteles brethesi Porter, 1917
 Apanteles brevicarinis Song, 2002
 Apanteles brevimetacarpus Hedqvist, 1965
 Apanteles brevivena Liu & Chen, 2015
 Apanteles bruchi Blanchard, 1941
 Apanteles brunnistigma Abdinbekova, 1969
 Apanteles brunnus Rao & Chalikwar, 1976
 Apanteles burunganus de Saeger, 1944
 Apanteles caesar Wilkinson, 1938
 Apanteles calixtomoragai Fernández-Triana, 2014
 Apanteles calycinae Wilkinson, 1928
 Apanteles camilla Nixon, 1965
 Apanteles camirus Nixon, 1965
 Apanteles canarsiae Ashmead, 1898
 Apanteles carloscastilloi Fernández-Triana, 2014
 Apanteles carlosguadamuzi Fernández-Triana, 2014
 Apanteles carlosrodriguezi Fernández-Triana, 2014
 Apanteles carlosviquezi Fernández-Triana, 2014
 Apanteles carloszunigai Fernández-Triana, 2014
 Apanteles carolinacanoae Fernández-Triana, 2014
 Apanteles carpatus (Say, 1836)
 Apanteles cassiae Chalikwar & Rao, 1982
 Apanteles cato de Saeger, 1944
 Apanteles cavatiptera Chen & Song, 2004
 Apanteles cavatithoracicus Chen, 2001
 Apanteles cavifrons Nixon, 1965
 Apanteles cebes Nixon, 1965
 Apanteles cecidiptae (Brèthes, 1916)
 Apanteles cerberus Nixon, 1965
 Apanteles cestius Nixon, 1965
 Apanteles chalcomelas Nixon, 1965
 Apanteles changhingensis Chu, 1937
 Apanteles characomae Risbec, 1951
 Apanteles chatterjeei Sharma & Chatterjee, 1970
 Apanteles chloris Nixon, 1965
 Apanteles christianzunigai Fernández-Triana, 2014
 Apanteles cingulicornis Granger, 1949
 Apanteles cinthiabarrantesae Fernández-Triana, 2014
 Apanteles ciriloumanai Fernández-Triana, 2014
 Apanteles clita Nixon, 1965
 Apanteles cockerelli Muesebeck, 1921
 Apanteles cocotis Wilkinson, 1934
 Apanteles coedicius Nixon, 1965
 Apanteles coffeellae Muesebeck, 1958
 Apanteles coilus Nixon, 1965
 Apanteles conanchetorum Viereck, 1917
 Apanteles concordalis Cameron, 1911
 Apanteles conon Nixon, 1965
 Apanteles conspicabilis de Saeger, 1944
 Apanteles contactus Papp, 1977
 Apanteles contaminatus (Haliday, 1834)
 Apanteles contemptus Nixon, 1965
 Apanteles cordoi de Santis, 1980
 Apanteles cornicula Chen & Song, 2004
 Apanteles cosmopterygivorus Liu & Chen, 2014
 Apanteles coxalis Szépligeti, 1911
 Apanteles crassicornis (Provancher, 1886)
 Apanteles crates Nixon, 1965
 Apanteles crispulae Blanchard, 1943
 Apanteles cristianalemani Fernández-Triana, 2014
 Apanteles crius Nixon, 1965
 Apanteles croceicornis Muesebeck, 1958
 Apanteles crocidolomiae Ahmad, 1945
 Apanteles crouzeli Blanchard, 1947
 Apanteles cuneiformis Song & Chen, 2004
 Apanteles curvicaudatus Granger, 1949
 Apanteles cynthiacorderoae Fernández-Triana, 2014
 Apanteles cyprioides Nixon, 1965
 Apanteles cypris Nixon, 1965
 Apanteles daimenes Nixon, 1965
 Apanteles dakotae Muesebeck, 1921
 Apanteles decoloratus Granger, 1949
 Apanteles deifiliadavilae Fernández-Triana, 2014
 Apanteles delhiensis Muesebeck & Subba Rao, 1958
 Apanteles dentatus Muesebeck, 1958
 Apanteles deplanatus Muesebeck, 1957
 Apanteles depressariae Muesebeck, 1931
 Apanteles derivatus Long, 2010
 Apanteles desantisi Blanchard, 1947
 Apanteles despectus Nixon, 1965
 Apanteles diatraeae Muesebeck, 1921
 Apanteles dickyui Fernández-Triana, 2014
 Apanteles dictys Nixon, 1965
 Apanteles didiguadamuzi Fernández-Triana, 2014
 Apanteles dido Nixon, 1965
 Apanteles diegoalpizari Fernández-Triana, 2014
 Apanteles diegotorresi Fernández-Triana, 2014
 Apanteles diniamartinezae Fernández-Triana, 2014
 Apanteles diocles Nixon, 1965
 Apanteles diourbeli Risbec, 1951
 Apanteles dissimilis Nixon, 1965
 Apanteles dores Nixon, 1965
 Apanteles dotus Nixon, 1965
 Apanteles drupes Nixon, 1965
 Apanteles dumosus Liu & Chen, 2014
 Apanteles duniagarciae Fernández-Triana, 2014
 Apanteles duplicatus Brèthes, 1922
 Apanteles duvalierbricenoi Fernández-Triana, 2014
 Apanteles edgarjimenezi Fernández-Triana, 2014
 Apanteles edithlopezae Fernández-Triana, 2014
 Apanteles eduardoramirezi Fernández-Triana, 2014
 Apanteles edwardsii Riley, 1889
 Apanteles edwinapuii Fernández-Triana, 2014
 Apanteles elagabalus Nixon, 1965
 Apanteles eldarayae Fernández-Triana, 2014
 Apanteles eliethcantillanoae Fernández-Triana, 2014
 Apanteles epiblemae Muesebeck, 1935
 Apanteles epijarbi Rao, 1953
 Apanteles epinotiae Viereck, 1912
 Apanteles erickduartei Fernández-Triana, 2014
 Apanteles eriphyle Nixon, 1965
 Apanteles erse Nixon, 1965
 Apanteles esthercentenoae Fernández-Triana, 2014
 Apanteles eublemmae Nixon, 1965
 Apanteles eugeniaphilipsae Fernández-Triana, 2014
 Apanteles eulogiosequeirai Fernández-Triana, 2014
 Apanteles eupolis Nixon, 1965
 Apanteles eurynome Nixon, 1965
 Apanteles eurytergis de Saeger, 1941
 Apanteles evadnix Shenefelt, 1972
 Apanteles evanidus Papp, 1975
 Apanteles evansi Nixon, 1971
 Apanteles faustina Nixon, 1965
 Apanteles federicomatarritai Fernández-Triana, 2014
 Apanteles felipechavarriai Fernández-Triana, 2014
 Apanteles felixcarmonai Fernández-Triana, 2014
 Apanteles feltiae Viereck, 1912
 Apanteles fernandochavarriai Fernández-Triana, 2014
 Apanteles firmus Telenga, 1949
 Apanteles flavicapus Liu & Chen, 2014
 Apanteles flavicentrus Long, 2010
 Apanteles flavigaster Long, 2010
 Apanteles floralis Tobias, 1966
 Apanteles flormoralesae Fernández-Triana, 2014
 Apanteles florus Nixon, 1965
 Apanteles fluitantis de Santis, 1980
 Apanteles fontinalis de Saeger, 1944
 Apanteles forbesi Viereck, 1910
 Apanteles franciscopizarroi Fernández-Triana, 2014
 Apanteles franciscoramirezi Fernández-Triana, 2014
 Apanteles freddyquesadai Fernández-Triana, 2014
 Apanteles freddysalazari Fernández-Triana, 2014
 Apanteles fredi Austin & Dangerfield, 1989
 Apanteles frersi (Brèthes, 1917)
 Apanteles fumiferanae Viereck, 1912
 Apanteles fundulus Nixon, 1965
 Apanteles gabrielagutierrezae Fernández-Triana, 2014
 Apanteles galatea Nixon, 1965
 Apanteles galleriae Wilkinson, 1932
 Apanteles gandoensis de Saeger, 1944
 Apanteles garygibsoni Fernández-Triana, 2014
 Apanteles gaytotini Blanchard, 1959
 Apanteles gerardobandoi Fernández-Triana, 2014
 Apanteles gerardosandovali Fernández-Triana, 2014
 Apanteles ghesquierei de Saeger, 1941
 Apanteles gialamensis Long, 2007
 Apanteles gitebe de Saeger, 1944
 Apanteles gladysrojasae Fernández-Triana, 2014
 Apanteles glenriverai Fernández-Triana, 2014
 Apanteles gloriasihezarae Fernández-Triana, 2014
 Apanteles goron Nixon, 1965
 Apanteles gracilicorne Song & Chen, 2004
 Apanteles gracilipes Song & Chen, 2004
 Apanteles guadaluperodriguezae Fernández-Triana, 2014
 Apanteles guamensis (Holmgren, 1868)
 Apanteles guillermopereirai Fernández-Triana, 2014
 Apanteles hainanensis Liu & Chen, 2015
 Apanteles halfordi Ullyett, 1946
 Apanteles hapaliae de Saeger, 1941
 Apanteles harryramirezi Fernández-Triana, 2014
 Apanteles harti Viereck, 1910
 Apanteles hatinhensis Long, 2010
 Apanteles haywardi Blanchard, 1947
 Apanteles hazelcambroneroae Fernández-Triana, 2014
 Apanteles hebrus Nixon, 1965
 Apanteles hectorsolisi Fernández-Triana, 2014
 Apanteles hedwigi Shenefelt, 1972
 Apanteles heichinensis Sonan, 1942
 Apanteles hellulae Risbec, 1951
 Apanteles hemara Nixon, 1965
 Apanteles hemiaurantius van Achterberg & Ng, 2009
 Apanteles hersilia Nixon, 1965
 Apanteles holmgreni Shenefelt, 1972
 Apanteles horaeus Kotenko, 1986
 Apanteles huberi Fernández-Triana, 2010
 Apanteles humbertolopezi Fernández-Triana, 2014
 Apanteles hyalinatus Granger, 1949
 Apanteles hymeniae Wilkinson, 1935
 Apanteles icarti Blanchard, 1960
 Apanteles imitandus Muesebeck, 1954
 Apanteles impiger Muesebeck, 1958
 Apanteles importunus Wilkinson, 1928
 Apanteles impunctatus Muesebeck, 1933
 Apanteles inaron Nixon, 1965
 Apanteles incurvus Liu & Chen, 2014
 Apanteles inesolisae Fernández-Triana, 2014
 Apanteles inops Nixon, 1965
 Apanteles insignicaudatus Granger, 1949
 Apanteles insularis Muesebeck, 1921
 Apanteles inunctus Nixon, 1965
 Apanteles ione Nixon, 1965
 Apanteles ippeus Nixon, 1965
 Apanteles irenecarrilloae Fernández-Triana, 2014
 Apanteles isaacbermudezi Fernández-Triana, 2014
 Apanteles isander Nixon, 1965
 Apanteles isidrochaconi Fernández-Triana, 2014
 Apanteles isidrovillegasi Fernández-Triana, 2014
 Apanteles ivondroensis Granger, 1949
 Apanteles ivonnetranae Fernández-Triana, 2014
 Apanteles jairomoyai Fernández-Triana, 2014
 Apanteles javiercontrerasi Fernández-Triana, 2014
 Apanteles javierobandoi Fernández-Triana, 2014
 Apanteles javiersihezari Fernández-Triana, 2014
 Apanteles jenniferae Fernández-Triana, 2010
 Apanteles jesusbrenesi Fernández-Triana, 2014
 Apanteles jesusugaldei Fernández-Triana, 2014
 Apanteles jimmychevezi Fernández-Triana, 2014
 Apanteles johanvargasi Fernández-Triana, 2014
 Apanteles jorgecortesi Fernández-Triana, 2014
 Apanteles jorgehernandezi Fernández-Triana, 2014
 Apanteles josecalvoi Fernández-Triana, 2014
 Apanteles josecortezi Fernández-Triana, 2014
 Apanteles josediazi Fernández-Triana, 2014
 Apanteles josejaramilloi Fernández-Triana, 2014
 Apanteles josemonteroi Fernández-Triana, 2014
 Apanteles joseperezi Fernández-Triana, 2014
 Apanteles joserasi Fernández-Triana, 2014
 Apanteles juanapuii Fernández-Triana, 2014
 Apanteles juancarrilloi Fernández-Triana, 2014
 Apanteles juangazoi Fernández-Triana, 2014
 Apanteles juanhernandezi Fernández-Triana, 2014
 Apanteles juanlopezi Fernández-Triana, 2014
 Apanteles juanmatai Fernández-Triana, 2014
 Apanteles juanvictori Fernández-Triana, 2014
 Apanteles jubmeli Hedqvist, 1972
 Apanteles juliodiazi Fernández-Triana, 2014
 Apanteles juniorlopezi Fernández-Triana, 2014
 Apanteles keineraragoni Fernández-Triana, 2014
 Apanteles kivuensis de Saeger, 1941
 Apanteles kubensis Abdinbekova, 1969
 Apanteles lacteus (Nees, 1834)
 Apanteles laevicoxis Muesebeck, 1921
 Apanteles lanassa Nixon, 1965
 Apanteles langenburgensis Szépligeti, 1911
 Apanteles laricellae Mason, 1959
 Apanteles latericarinatus Song & Chen, 2001
 Apanteles latisulca Chen & Song, 2004
 Apanteles laurahuberae Fernández-Triana, 2014
 Apanteles laurenmoralesae Fernández-Triana, 2014
 Apanteles lavignei Blanchard, 1959
 Apanteles laxus de Saeger, 1944
 Apanteles lectus Tobias, 1964
 Apanteles lenea Nixon, 1976
 Apanteles leninguadamuzi Fernández-Triana, 2014
 Apanteles leonelgarayi Fernández-Triana, 2014
 Apanteles leptothecus (Cameron, 1907)
 Apanteles leptoura Cameron, 1909
 Apanteles leucochiloneae Cameron, 1911
 Apanteles leucopus (Ashmead, 1900)
 Apanteles leucostigmus (Ashmead, 1900)
 Apanteles lilliammenae Fernández-Triana, 2014
 Apanteles lineodos Cameron, 1911
 Apanteles linus Nixon, 1965
 Apanteles liopleuris Szépligeti, 1914
 Apanteles lisabearssae Fernández-Triana, 2014
 Apanteles longiantenna Chen & Song, 2004
 Apanteles longicaudatus You & Zhou, 1991
 Apanteles longirostris Chen & Song, 2004
 Apanteles longistylus de Saeger, 1944
 Apanteles longitergiae Rao & Kurian, 1950
 Apanteles luciariosae Fernández-Triana, 2014
 Apanteles luisbrizuelai Fernández-Triana, 2014
 Apanteles luiscanalesi Fernández-Triana, 2014
 Apanteles luiscantillanoi Fernández-Triana, 2014
 Apanteles luisgarciai Fernández-Triana, 2014
 Apanteles luisgaritai Fernández-Triana, 2014
 Apanteles luishernandezi Fernández-Triana, 2014
 Apanteles luislopezi Fernández-Triana, 2014
 Apanteles luisvargasi Fernández-Triana, 2014
 Apanteles lunata Song & Chen, 2004
 Apanteles luteocinctus de Saeger, 1941
 Apanteles luzmariaromeroae Fernández-Triana, 2014
 Apanteles lycidas Nixon, 1965
 Apanteles lyridice Nixon, 1965
 Apanteles machaeralis Wilkinson, 1928
 Apanteles macromphaliae Silva Figueroa, 1917
 Apanteles magnioculus Liu & Chen, 2015
 Apanteles malleus Liu & Chen, 2014
 Apanteles mamitus Nixon, 1965
 Apanteles manuelarayai Fernández-Triana, 2014
 Apanteles manuelpereirai Fernández-Triana, 2014
 Apanteles manuelriosi Fernández-Triana, 2014
 Apanteles manuelzumbadoi Fernández-Triana, 2014
 Apanteles marcobustosi Fernández-Triana, 2014
 Apanteles marcogonzalezi Fernández-Triana, 2014
 Apanteles marcovenicioi Fernández-Triana, 2014
 Apanteles mariachavarriae Fernández-Triana, 2014
 Apanteles mariaguevarae Fernández-Triana, 2014
 Apanteles marialuisariasae Fernández-Triana, 2014
 Apanteles mariamendezae Fernández-Triana, 2014
 Apanteles marianopereirai Fernández-Triana, 2014
 Apanteles mariatorrentesae Fernández-Triana, 2014
 Apanteles marisolarroyoae Fernández-Triana, 2014
 Apanteles marisolnavarroae Fernández-Triana, 2014
 Apanteles marvinmendozai Fernández-Triana, 2014
 Apanteles masoni Chen & Song, 2004
 Apanteles mauriciogurdiani Fernández-Triana, 2014
 Apanteles medioexcavatus Granger, 1949
 Apanteles medioimpressus Granger, 1949
 Apanteles medon Nixon, 1965
 Apanteles megastidis Muesebeck, 1958
 Apanteles megathymi Riley, 1881
 Apanteles mehdialii Rao & Chalikwar, 1970
 Apanteles melpomene Nixon, 1965
 Apanteles menes Nixon, 1965
 Apanteles meriones Nixon, 1965
 Apanteles metacarpalis (Thomson, 1895)
 Apanteles metacarpellatus Blanchard, 1963
 Apanteles metagenes Nixon, 1965
 Apanteles metellus Nixon, 1965
 Apanteles milenagutierrezae Fernández-Triana, 2014
 Apanteles milleri Mason, 1974
 Apanteles mimoristae Muesebeck, 1922
 Apanteles minatchy Rousse & Gupta, 2013
 Apanteles minator Muesebeck, 1957
 Apanteles minor Fahringer, 1938
 Apanteles minorcarmonai Fernández-Triana, 2014
 Apanteles minornavarroi Fernández-Triana, 2014
 Apanteles miramis Nixon, 1976
 Apanteles mohandasi Sumodan & Narendran, 1990
 Apanteles monicachavarriae Fernández-Triana, 2014
 Apanteles montezumae Sánchez, Figueroa & Whitfield, 2015
 Apanteles morrisi Mason, 1974
 Apanteles morroensis Nixon, 1955
 Apanteles mujtabai Bhatnagar, 1950
 Apanteles munnarensis Sumodan & Narendran, 1990
 Apanteles murcia Nixon, 1965
 Apanteles muticiculus Liu & Chen, 2014
 Apanteles mutilia Nixon, 1965
 Apanteles mycerinus Nixon, 1965
 Apanteles mycetophilus Wilkinson, 1931
 Apanteles myrsus Nixon, 1965
 Apanteles namkumensis Gupta, 1957
 Apanteles natras Nixon, 1965
 Apanteles navius Nixon, 1965
 Apanteles nemesis Nixon, 1965
 Apanteles neotaeniaticornis Yousuf & Ray, 2010
 Apanteles nepe Nixon, 1965
 Apanteles nephereus Nixon, 1965
 Apanteles nephoptericis (Packard, 1864)
 Apanteles nephus Papp, 1974
 Apanteles niceppe Nixon, 1965
 Apanteles nidophilus Whitfield & Cameron, 2001
 Apanteles nigrofemoratus Granger, 1949
 Apanteles ninigretorum Viereck, 1917
 Apanteles nitidus de Saeger, 1944
 Apanteles nivellus Nixon, 1965
 Apanteles nixoni Song, 2002
 Apanteles noronhai de Santis, 1975
 Apanteles novatus Nixon, 1965
 Apanteles nycon Nixon, 1965
 Apanteles nymphis Nixon, 1965
 Apanteles oatmani Marsh, 1979
 Apanteles obscurus (Nees, 1834)
 Apanteles oculatus Tobias, 1967
 Apanteles odites Nixon, 1965
 Apanteles oenone Nixon, 1965
 Apanteles olorus Nixon, 1965
 Apanteles opacus (Ashmead, 1905)
 Apanteles opuntiarum Martínez & Berta, 2012
 Apanteles orientalis Szépligeti, 1913
 Apanteles oritias Nixon, 1965
 Apanteles oroetes Nixon, 1965
 Apanteles orphne Nixon, 1965
 Apanteles ortia Nixon, 1965
 Apanteles orus Nixon, 1965
 Apanteles oryzicola Watanabe, 1967
 Apanteles oscarchavezi Fernández-Triana, 2014
 Apanteles oscus Nixon, 1965
 Apanteles osvaldoespinozai Fernández-Triana, 2014
 Apanteles pablotranai Fernández-Triana, 2014
 Apanteles pabloumanai Fernández-Triana, 2014
 Apanteles pablovasquezi Fernández-Triana, 2014
 Apanteles pachycarinatus Song & Chen, 2002
 Apanteles painei Nixon, 1965
 Apanteles paraglaope Long, 2010
 Apanteles paraguayensis Brèthes, 1924
 Apanteles paralus Nixon, 1965
 Apanteles paranthrenidis Muesebeck, 1921
 Apanteles parapholetesor Liu & Chen, 2015
 Apanteles parkeri Muesebeck, 1954
 Apanteles parsodes Nixon, 1965
 Apanteles parvus Liu & Chen, 2014
 Apanteles pashmina Rousse, 2013
 Apanteles pastranai Blanchard, 1960
 Apanteles patens Nixon, 1965
 Apanteles paulaixcamparijae Fernández-Triana, 2014
 Apanteles peisonis Fischer, 1965
 Apanteles pellucipterus Song & Chen, 2001
 Apanteles pentagonalis Blanchard, 1963
 Apanteles pentagonius de Saeger, 1944
 Apanteles peridoneus Papp, 1974
 Apanteles persephone Nixon, 1965
 Apanteles pertiades Nixon, 1965
 Apanteles petilicaudium Chen, Song & Yang, 2002
 Apanteles petronariosae Fernández-Triana, 2014
 Apanteles phalis Nixon, 1965
 Apanteles phtorimoeae Risbec, 1951
 Apanteles phycodis Viereck, 1913
 Apanteles piceotrichosus Blanchard, 1947
 Apanteles pilosus Telenga, 1955
 Apanteles platyptiliophagus Shenefelt, 1972
 Apanteles platyptiliovorus Blanchard, 1965
 Apanteles plesius Viereck, 1912
 Apanteles polychrosidis Viereck, 1912
 Apanteles pongamiae Sumodan & Narendran, 1990
 Apanteles prinoptus Papp, 1984
 Apanteles procoxalis Hedqvist, 1965
 Apanteles prosopis Risbec, 1951
 Apanteles prusias Nixon, 1965
 Apanteles psenes Nixon, 1965
 Apanteles pseudoglossae Muesebeck, 1921
 Apanteles pseudomacromphaliae Havrylenko & Winterhalter, 1949
 Apanteles pusaensis Lal, 1942
 Apanteles pycnos Nixon, 1965
 Apanteles pyrodercetus de Saeger, 1941
 Apanteles quadratus Anjum & Malik, 1978
 Apanteles quadrifacies Papp, 1984
 Apanteles quinquecarinis Song & Chen, 2003
 Apanteles racilla Nixon, 1965
 Apanteles raesus Nixon, 1965
 Apanteles randallgarciai Fernández-Triana, 2014
 Apanteles randallmartinezi Fernández-Triana, 2014
 Apanteles raulacevedoi Fernández-Triana, 2014
 Apanteles raulsolorsanoi Fernández-Triana, 2014
 Apanteles raviantenna Chen & Song, 2004
 Apanteles rhipheus Nixon, 1965
 Apanteles rhomboidalis (Ashmead, 1900)
 Apanteles ricardocaleroi Fernández-Triana, 2014
 Apanteles ricini Bhatnagar, 1950
 Apanteles riograndensis Brèthes, 1920
 Apanteles risbeci de Saeger, 1942
 Apanteles robertmontanoi Fernández-Triana, 2014
 Apanteles robertoespinozai Fernández-Triana, 2014
 Apanteles robertovargasi Fernández-Triana, 2014
 Apanteles robustus Hedqvist, 1965
 Apanteles rodrigogamezi Fernández-Triana, 2014
 Apanteles rogerblancoi Fernández-Triana, 2014
 Apanteles rolandoramosi Fernández-Triana, 2014
 Apanteles rolandovegai Fernández-Triana, 2014
 Apanteles romei Rousse, 2013
 Apanteles ronaldcastroi Fernández-Triana, 2014
 Apanteles ronaldgutierrezi Fernández-Triana, 2014
 Apanteles ronaldmurilloi Fernández-Triana, 2014
 Apanteles ronaldnavarroi Fernández-Triana, 2014
 Apanteles ronaldquirosi Fernández-Triana, 2014
 Apanteles ronaldzunigai Fernández-Triana, 2014
 Apanteles rosaces Nixon, 1965
 Apanteles rosibelelizondoae Fernández-Triana, 2014
 Apanteles rostermoragai Fernández-Triana, 2014
 Apanteles roughleyi Fernández-Triana, 2010
 Apanteles rufithorax Hedqvist, 1965
 Apanteles rugiceps Wilkinson, 1934
 Apanteles ruthfrancoae Fernández-Triana, 2014
 Apanteles rutilans Nixon, 1965
 Apanteles saegeri Risbec, 1951
 Apanteles sagax Wilkinson, 1929
 Apanteles salutifer Wilkinson, 1931
 Apanteles samedovi Abdinbekova, 1969
 Apanteles samoanus Fullaway, 1940
 Apanteles saravus Nixon, 1965
 Apanteles sauros Nixon, 1965
 Apanteles schneideri Nixon, 1965
 Apanteles schoutedeni de Saeger, 1941
 Apanteles sergiocascantei Fernández-Triana, 2014
 Apanteles sergioriosi Fernández-Triana, 2014
 Apanteles seyrigi Wilkinson, 1936
 Apanteles sigifredomarini Fernández-Triana, 2014
 Apanteles significans (Walker, 1860)
 Apanteles singaporensis Szépligeti, 1905
 Apanteles smerdis Nixon, 1965
 Apanteles sodalis (Haliday, 1834)
 Apanteles solox Nixon, 1965
 Apanteles sosis Nixon, 1965
 Apanteles sparsus Liu & Chen, 2015
 Apanteles spicicula Chen & Song, 2004
 Apanteles stagmatophorae Gahan, 1919
 Apanteles starki Mason, 1960
 Apanteles stegenodactylae Cameron, 1909
 Apanteles stennos Nixon, 1965
 Apanteles stenomae Muesebeck, 1958
 Apanteles stictipes Chen & Song, 2004
 Apanteles striatopleurus Hedqvist, 1965
 Apanteles subaltus de Saeger, 1944
 Apanteles subandinus Blanchard, 1947
 Apanteles subcamilla Long, 2007
 Apanteles subcristatus Blanchard, 1936
 Apanteles subductus (Walker, 1860)
 Apanteles subrugosus Granger, 1949
 Apanteles sulciscutis (Cameron, 1905)
 Apanteles syleptae Ferrière, 1925
 Apanteles sylvaticus de Saeger, 1944
 Apanteles symithae Bhatnagar, 1950
 Apanteles tachardiae Cameron, 1913
 Apanteles taeniaticornis Wilkinson, 1928
 Apanteles taiticus (Holmgren, 1868)
 Apanteles talinum Risbec, 1951
 Apanteles tapatapaoanus Fullaway, 1946
 Apanteles taragamae Viereck, 1912
 Apanteles telon Nixon, 1965
 Apanteles thoracartus Liu & Chen, 2015
 Apanteles thurberiae Muesebeck, 1921
 Apanteles tiapi Risbec, 1952
 Apanteles tiboshartae Fernández-Triana, 2014
 Apanteles tigasis Nixon, 1965
 Apanteles tirathabae Wilkinson, 1928
 Apanteles townesi Nixon, 1965
 Apanteles transtergum Liu & Chen, 2014
 Apanteles triareus Nixon, 1965
 Apanteles tricoloripes Granger, 1949
 Apanteles trifasciatus Muesebeck, 1946
 Apanteles trochanteratus Szépligeti, 1911
 Apanteles tulis Nixon, 1965
 Apanteles uchidai Watanabe, 1934
 Apanteles unguifortis Song & Chen, 2004
 Apanteles upis Nixon, 1965
 Apanteles uroxys de Saeger, 1941
 Apanteles usipetes Nixon, 1965
 Apanteles ussuriensis Telenga, 1955
 Apanteles vacillans Nixon, 1965
 Apanteles vala Nixon, 1965
 Apanteles valvatus de Saeger, 1944
 Apanteles valvulae Rao & Kurian, 1951
 Apanteles vannesabrenesae Fernández-Triana, 2014
 Apanteles verticalis Song & Chen, 2004
 Apanteles victorbarrantesi Fernández-Triana, 2014
 Apanteles vivax de Saeger, 1944
 Apanteles vulgaris (Ashmead, 1900)
 Apanteles wadyobandoi Fernández-Triana, 2014
 Apanteles waldymedinai Fernández-Triana, 2014
 Apanteles wanei Risbec, 1951
 Apanteles weitenweberi (Amerling, 1862)
 Apanteles wilbertharayai Fernández-Triana, 2014
 Apanteles williamcamposi Fernández-Triana, 2014
 Apanteles wuyiensis Song & Chen, 2002
 Apanteles xanthostigma (Haliday, 1834)
 Apanteles xerophila Risbec, 1951
 Apanteles yeissonchavesi Fernández-Triana, 2014
 Apanteles yilbertalvaradoi Fernández-Triana, 2014
 Apanteles yolandarojasae Fernández-Triana, 2014
 Apanteles zeneidabolanosae Fernández-Triana, 2014
 Apanteles zhangi Song & Chen, 2003
 Apanteles zizaniae Muesebeck, 1957
 Apanteles znoikoi Tobias, 1976
 † Apanteles concinnus Statz, 1938
 † Apanteles macrophthalmus Statz, 1938

References

Apanteles